Henry Wulschleger or Henri Wulschleger (1894–1943) was a French screenwriter and film director.

Selected filmography

 Une nuit agitée (1920)
 Pervenche (1921) (co-direction : Alfred Machin)
  Moi aussi, j'accuse (1923) (screenwriter) 
 L'énigme du Mont-Agel (1923) (co-direction: Alfred Machin)
  The Heirs of Uncle James (1924) (script)
  Le Nègre blanc (1925) (co-direction : Nicolas Rinsky)  Humanité (1925)
  Bêtes comme les hommes (1925) (coréalisation : Alfred Machin)
  Le Manoir de la peur (1927) (coréalisation : Alfred Machin)
  Captain Fracasse (1929) (assistant and screenwriter)
  Elle veut faire du cinéma (1930)
  La Prison en folie (1931)
  En bordée (1931)
  The Blaireau Case (1932)
 The Regiment's Champion (1932)
 Tire-au-flanc (1933)
  Bach the Millionaire (1933)
  L'Enfant de ma sœur (1933)
   (1935)
  (1934)
  Bout de chou (1935)
 Debout là-dedans! (1935)
 Tout va très bien madame la marquise (1936)
  Le Cantinier de la coloniale (1938)
 Gargousse (1938)
  Bach en correctionnelle (1940)

 References 

 Bibliography 
 Crisp, Colin. French Cinema—A Critical Filmography: Volume 1, 1929–1939''. Indiana University Press, 2015.

External links 
 

1894 births
1943 deaths
20th-century French screenwriters
French film directors